In mathematics, negative definiteness is a property of any object to which a bilinear form may be naturally associated, which is negative-definite. See, in particular:

 Negative-definite bilinear form
 Negative-definite quadratic form
 Negative-definite matrix
 Negative-definite function

Quadratic forms